Harpeth Furnace is an archeological site in or near Fernvale in Williamson County, Tennessee, United States.  It was listed on the National Register of Historic Places in 1988, as Harpeth Furnace (40WM83); 40WM83 is the Smithsonian trinomial code for the site.

The property was covered in a Multiple Property Submission study of "Historic and Historic Archaeological Resources of the Iron Industry on the Western Highland Rim  1790s - 1920s" and/or an extension of that study.

References

Archaeological sites on the National Register of Historic Places in Tennessee
Blast furnaces in the United States
Buildings and structures in Williamson County, Tennessee
Industrial buildings and structures on the National Register of Historic Places in Tennessee
National Register of Historic Places in Williamson County, Tennessee